Gumansinhji Vaghela is the Titular King of Deodar State and was a leader of Bharatiya Janata party from Gujarat. He served as the Speaker of the Gujarat Legislative Assembly from 1996 to 1998.  Vaghela was elected to the assembly from Deodar in Banaskantha district.

References

Living people
Speakers of the Gujarat Legislative Assembly
People from Banaskantha district
Year of birth missing (living people)
Gujarat MLAs 1995–1998
Bharatiya Janata Party politicians from Gujarat